MFZ 10-7 (3-fluoro-5-((6-methylpyridin-2-yl)ethynyl)benzonitrile) is a drug with potential applications in the treatment of addiction, which acts as a negative allosteric modulator of the metabotropic glutamate receptor subtype 5 (mGluR5). Others of the kind, namely MPEP & MTEP, are not considered to have translational potential for human use  due to off-target effects and short half-lives. Drugs of this kind have been used to offset craving for drugs of abuse such as cocaine in in vivo animal administration models.

See also 
 Fenobam
 CTEP

References 

MGlu5 receptor antagonists